The Fall River is a river in Frontenac and Lanark Counties in Eastern Ontario, Canada. It is part of the Ottawa River drainage basin, and flows from Sharbot Lake and through Bennett Lake to join the Mississippi River. The river is named after settlers of the late 17th century.

Course
The Fall River is fed from Sharbot Lake in Central Frontenac, Frontenac County and numerous springs, and it meanders along the Trans Canada Trail.

Ecology
The river is bordered by forest and is home to fish, turtles, Blue Herons, beaver and otters

Tributaries
Bolton Creek
Silver Lake Creek

See also
List of rivers of Ontario

References

Sources

External links
 Mississippi Valley Conservation

Rivers of Frontenac County
Rivers of Lanark County